The Meat of Life is the seventh studio album by indie rock band Clem Snide, released on February 23, 2010 on 429 Records. It is the first entirely new album by the band since singer Eef Barzelay's brief stint as a solo artist.

Track listing
 "Walmart Parking Lot" - 2:35
 "Denise" - 3:28
 "The Meat of Life" - 4:21
 "I Got High" - 4:21
 "Denver" - 3:45
 "Forgive Me, Love" - 4:28
 "Stoney" - 3:18
 "BFF" - 1:58
 "Please" - 2:24
 "Song for Mary" - 4:23
 "With Nothing Much to Show of It" - 4:57
 "Anita" - 3:43
 "Star of David (Bonus Track)" - 3:27

References

Clem Snide albums
2010 albums
429 Records albums